Digby George Gerahty (3 April 1898 – 6 November 1981), who wrote under the pen-names of Robert Standish and Stephen Lister, was an English novelist and short story writer most productive during the 1940s and 1950s. He was also a featured contributor to the Saturday Evening Post. His novels include Elephant Walk, which was later made into a film starring Elizabeth Taylor. In the semi-autobiographical Marise (1950), Gerahty (writing as "Stephen Lister") claimed that he and two publicist colleagues had covertly "invented" the Loch Ness Monster in 1933 as part of a contract to improve business for local hotels; he repeated his claim to Henry Bauer, a researcher, in 1980.

He was born in 1898 in Isleworth, the son of George and Laura. He was the elder brother of the actor Leslie Marsh Gerahty (better known as Garry Marsh) and the younger brother of the journalist Cecil Gerahty.

He joined the Royal Airforce on 7 July 1917 and served until 15 February 1919, leaving with a temporary commission as 2nd lieutenant.

He was first married in 1934 with a second marriage, to Ethyle R D Campbell, in 1938, Paddington. 

Gerahty died at his home in Valbonne, Provence-Alpes-Côte d'Azur, in the South of France, aged 83.

Works
The Three Bamboos (1942)
Bonin (1943)
The Small General (1945)
Mr. On Loong (1947)
Peace Comes to Sainte Monique (1947)
Elephant Walk (1948)
The Gulf of Time (1948)
Gentleman of China (1949)
Follow the Seventh Man (1950)
Marise (1950)
A Worthy Man (1952)
Fit for a Bishop; or, How to Keep a Fat Priest in Prime Condition (Recipes) (1953, 1955) (written as by Stephen Lister)
A Long Way from Pimlico (1954) (published in the United States as Escape from Pimlico)
Face Value (1955) (short stories)
Blind Tiger (1956)
Honourable Ancestor (1956)
Storm Centre (1957)
African Guinea Pig (1958)
The Radio-Active General and Other Stories (1959)
The Big One Got Away (1960)
The First of Trees: The Story of The Olive (1960)
The Talking Dog: and Other Stories (1961)
Singapore Kate (1964)
End of The Line (1965)
The Widow Hack (1966)
The Course of True Love (1968)
Elephant Law, and Other Stories (1969)
Rickshaw Boy (1970)
Hungarian Roulette (1972) (written as by Stephen Lister)
The Silk Tontine (1972)
The Fountain of Youth, and Other Stories (1973)
The Short Match (1974)
Dabney's Reef (1975)
The dog that never was (1975)
The Cruise of The 'Three Brothers'  (1976)
Green Fire (1976)
The Gulf of Time (1976)
The Story of Mary Lee (1978)
The Prince of Storytellers (1979)

References

External links

1898 births
1981 deaths
English male novelists
20th-century English novelists
Loch Ness Monster
20th-century English male writers
People from Isleworth